Willem Warmont, initially called K 3, was a  of the Dutch Koninklijke Marine. She was decommissioned in 1937.

Service history
Willem Warmont was commissioned in to the Koninklijke Marine in 1905. In 1936 she was being used as a training vessel for engineers and stokers. She was decommissioned from service in 1937.

References

K-class torpedo boats
Ships built in Schiedam
1905 ships